This page is a list of the Minnesota Vikings NFL Draft selections. The first draft the Vikings participated in was the 1961 NFL Draft, in which they made Tommy Mason of Tulane their first ever selection.

Key

1961

1962

1963

1964

1965

1966

1967

1968

1969

1970

1971

1972

1973

1974

1975

1976

1977

1978

1979

1980

1981

1982

1983

1984

1985

1986

1987

1988

1989

1990

1991

1992

1993

1994

1995

1996

1997

1998

1999

2000

2001

2002

2003

2004

2005

2006

2007

2008

2009

2010

2011

2012

2013

2014

2015

2016

2017

2018

2019

2020

2021

2022

See also
History of the Minnesota Vikings

Draft History
Minnesota